Goof Troop is an action-adventure video game for the Super Nintendo Entertainment System developed and released by Capcom in North America in July 1993, in Europe on November 25, 1993, and in Japan on July 22, 1994, and based on the animated television series of the same name. The game can be played in both single-player and multiplayer mode, wherein one player controls Goofy and the other Max.

Goof Troop is one of the first games designed by Shinji Mikami, who would go on to be renowned for his work on the Resident Evil series.

Gameplay

Playing as Goofy or Max, the player(s) works through five areas on Spoonerville Island: on the beach, in a village under siege, a haunted castle, a cavern, and finally the pirate's ship where Pete and PJ are held captive. Goofy moves slower than Max but can deal more damage to enemies.

The goal of each level is to solve various puzzles in order to reach the end of the stage and defeat the boss. Although Goofy and Max cannot fight directly, they can use various methods to defeat enemies such as throwing objects such as barrels or bombs at them, kicking blocks into them, knocking them off the stage or luring them into the path of enemy attacks. Throughout the game, players can find various collectible items that can aid them. Collecting pieces of fruit can protect Max or Goofy from a single hit, with extra lives earned if the player can collect a certain amount of fruit without getting hit. Collecting red diamonds earns an extra life while blue diamonds earn a continue. In multiplayer, if one player loses all of their lives, they can respawn with three more lives if the player can move to another screen. However, if both players lose all their lives on the same screen, the game is over, although if they have any continues, they can continue from the same screen. Otherwise, they will have to resume from the beginning of the stage using a password.

In order to progress through the game, players must collect various items to use. Each player can only hold one item at a time (two in single player). The grappling hook is used to cross large gaps between hooks, though can also be used to knock back enemies and collect items from long distances. The bell is used to lure the attention of enemies in order to set off puzzles or set them up for an ambush by the other player. Other items include candles to light up dark areas, shovels to dig up soft dirt for items, boards to cover gaps in bridges and keys to unlock certain gates and doors. Certain doors will only be opened under certain conditions, such as sliding blocks into places or defeating all the enemies on screen.

At the end of each level is a boss fight, where the boss must be defeated using various throwable objects that appear in the room.

Plot
On a great day for fishing in Spoonerville, Goofy and his son Max go out to the sea. While fishing, they see a huge pirate ship heading towards Spoonerville with Pete and PJ kidnapped. Goofy tries to catch up with the ship, but doesn't succeed until the ship lands on the pirate's island.

Upon landing on the island and defeating a group of pirates, Goofy and Max learn that the pirates have mistaken Pete for their captain, Keelhaul Pete, who had been swallowed by a whale a long time ago. As Goofy and Max explore of the island and fighting more pirates, Pete and PJ keep up the misconception, as Pete enjoys being the pirate king.

Eventually, Goofy and Max reach the pirate's ship, and see what appears to be Pete. Goofy attempts to save him, but accidentally knocks him out. Max then realizes that the person they assumed to be Pete is actually the real Keelhaul Pete, having returned after the whale spat him out. Concerned with the safety of their neighbors, Goofy and Max infiltrate the pirate ship, climaxing with another run-in with Keelhaul Pete. After defeating him, they find Pete and PJ about to be fed to an alligator, and they promptly rescue them. Suspending Keelhaul Pete over the alligator in their place, Goofy, Max, Pete, and PJ return to their fishing trip.

Reception 

Goof Troop received mixed-to-positive reviews upon its release. Nintendo Power gave it a 3.525 out of 5. Though the review criticized the challenge for being "fairly low", it did say that "the game is still great fun". Ingo Zaborowski of MAN!AC gave the game a 75% score. In 2013, Andy Green of Nintendo Life largely lauded the game, stating: "Goof Troop is an absolute gem of a game when teaming up with a friend in multiplayer. It might be short, the gameplay may be simple and the puzzles are easy but there's no denying it's an incredibly enjoyable experience when both members of the Troop are on screen". In the same review, Green criticized the single player mode, stating: "the simplistic nature of the game and its low difficulty level makes it tedious and as time goes on you'll get fed up completing puzzles that were evidently designed for more than one person".

See also
 List of Disney video games

Notes

References

External links 
 Goof Troop at Giant Bomb
 Goof Troop at MobyGames

1993 video games
Cooperative video games
Disney games by Capcom
Goof Troop
Goofy (Disney) video games
Multiplayer and single-player video games
Super Nintendo Entertainment System games
Super Nintendo Entertainment System-only games
Top-down video games
Video games about dogs
Video games about pirates
Video games based on animated television series
Video games designed by Shinji Mikami
Video games developed in Japan